Inga-Stina Ewbank SBS (13 June 1932 – 7 June 2004) was a Swedish-born academic and educator in Great Britain, Munich, Hong Kong and the United States, as well as an author and translator. She is believed to have been to date the only holder of an English chair of English Literature to have spoken no English until the age of 19 (in her case, having spoken only Swedish until that time).

Early life and education
Born as Inga-Stina Ekeblad, she attended school in Gothenburg before winning a scholarship to Carleton College, Minnesota. After graduating she had a string of research appointments: at Sheffield University (MA), at Liverpool University (as William Noble Fellow) from 1955 to 1957, and at the Shakespeare Institute of Birmingham University from 1957 to 1960. During the later part of this period she taught at the University of Munich.

Teaching English literature
She returned to Liverpool University as Lecturer in 1960, and was promoted to a Senior Lecturership in 1970. Her interest in women's literature was demonstrated by Their Proper Sphere: a study of the Brontë sisters as early-Victorian female novelists (1966). In 1972 she became Reader in English literature at Bedford College, London.

In 1985 Professor Ewbank accepted a chair at the University of Leeds. Greatly in demand as a lecturer and at overseas conferences, she travelled widely, with spells as a visiting scholar at Harvard University and other American universities. From 1982 to 1997 she was a member of the University Grants Committee for the University of Hong Kong.

She is believed to have been to date the only holder of an English chair of English Literature to have spoken no English until the age of 19 (in her case, having spoken only Swedish until that time).

She was recognized as a scholar of Ibsen's works and worked increasingly in both England and Norway during the later part of her life.

Death
She died in London on 7 June 2004, a week before her 72nd birthday.

Family
In 1959 she married Roger Ewbank; they had one son and two daughters.

Awards
 Elected to the Norwegian Academy of Science and Letters in 1991
 Honorary doctorate from the University of Hong Kong in 1999
 Awarded the Silver Bauhinia Star in 1999
 Honorary doctorate from the University of Oslo in 1998
 Honorary doctorate from the University of Gothenburg in 2001

Further reading

External links
Ewbank biodata
Obituary in The Independent
JHU.edu website

1932 births
2004 deaths
Harvard University staff
Norwegian–English translators
People from Gothenburg
Swedish scholars and academics
Swedish translators
Recipients of the Silver Bauhinia Star
Academics of the University of Leeds
20th-century translators
20th-century Swedish women writers
20th-century non-fiction writers
Academics of the University of Liverpool
Academics of Bedford College, London